Wolfgang Staudte (9 October 1906 – 19 January 1984), born Georg Friedrich Staudte, was a German film director, script writer and actor. He was born in Saarbrücken.

After 1945, Staudte also looked at German guilt in the cinema. Alongside Helmut Käutner, he was considered the only German post-war director of any standing who, after 1945, could look back on continuous artistic filmmaking far removed from Heimatfilm and the suppression of history. Staudte's films stood for politically committed cinema as well as for professional craftsmanship, for film art and (good) entertainment with a social claim. 

His most important work came in the ten years following World War II, in which he worked with the DEFA in East Germany. The main focus of his work was to highlight the limits of German national pride. His work in anti-Nazi films, such as Murderers Among Us (1946), was also a personal working-through of his film career under the Nazis (he acted in the anti-Semitic film Jud Süß). Following 1956, he worked in West Germany. By the 1970s, his work was no longer considered particularly modern and he moved to television. He appeared on shows such as Der Kommissar and Tatort.

He is the great-uncle of the German-Iranian director and novelist Andy Siege.

Filmography

As director
Film
Bravo Acrobat! (1943)
 (1944) — based on a story by Johann von Vásáry
 (1944, lost film, rediscovered 1996)
The Murderers Are Among Us (1946)
The Adventures of Fridolin (1948) — remake of the lost film Der Mann, dem man den Namen stahl
Rotation (1949)
Second Hand Destiny (1949)
A Tale of Five Cities (1951, anthology film)
Der Untertan (1951) — based on the novel Der Untertan by Heinrich Mann
Poison in the Zoo (directed by Hans Müller, 1952)
 (premiere: 1952, Überläufer from 1945)
Die Geschichte vom kleinen Muck (1953) — based on the fairy tale Little Muck by Wilhelm Hauff
Leuchtfeuer (1954)
Ciske de Rat (Dutch-language, 1955) — based on the novel Ciske de Rat by Piet Bakker
Ciske – ein Kind braucht Liebe (German-language, 1955) — based on the novel Ciske de Rat by Piet Bakker
Mutter Courage und ihre Kinder (1955, unfinished film) — based on Brecht's Mother Courage and Her Children
Rose Bernd (1957) — based on Rose Bernd by Gerhart Hauptmann
Escape from Sahara (1958)
 (1958) — screenplay by Ennio de Concini, Duccio Tessari and W. Staudte
The Muzzle (1958) — based on a novel by Heinrich Spoerl
Roses for the Prosecutor (1959)
The Fair (1960)
The Last Witness (1960) — based on a book by Maximilian Vernberg
The Happy Years of the Thorwalds (co-director: , 1962) — based on Time and the Conways by J. B. Priestley
 (1963) — based on Brecht's Threepenny Opera
Destination Death (1964)
 (1964) — based on a story by 
 (1966) — based on a play by Charles Rudolph
 (1968)
Gentlemen in White Vests (1970)
Jailbreak in Hamburg (1971)
 (1978)
Television
Die Rebellion (1962, TV film) — based on the novel Rebellion by Joseph Roth
 (1966, TV film)
Die Klasse (1968, TV film) — based on a novel by Hermann Ungar
Die Gartenlaube (1970, TV film) — based on a play by Hermann Ungar
Der Kommissar: Messer im Rücken (1970, TV series episode)
Der Kommissar: ...wie die Wölfe (1970, TV series episode)
 (1970, TV series, 5 episodes)
Die Person (1970, TV film) — based on a story by 
Der Kommissar: Besuch bei Alberti (1971, TV series episode)
Der Kommissar: Ende eines Tanzvergnügens (1971, TV series episode)
Der Kommissar: Die Anhalterin (1971, TV series episode)
Der Kommissar: Lisa Bassenges Mörder (1971, TV series episode)
Der Kommissar: Tod eines Ladenbesitzers (1971, TV series episode)
 (1971, TV miniseries) — based on The Sea-Wolf by Jack London
Der Kommissar: Ein rätselhafter Mord (1971, TV series episode)
Der Kommissar: Die Tote im Park (1972, TV series episode)
 (1972, TV film) — based on a novel by Raoul Anderland 
Marya Sklodowska-Curie (1972, TV film) — biographical film about Marie Curie
Der Kommissar: Das Komplott (1973, TV series episode)
Der Kommissar: Die Nacht, in der Basseck starb (1973, TV series episode)
Der Kommissar: Ein Funken in der Kälte (1973, TV series episode)
Nerze nachts am Straßenrand (1973, TV film) — based on a novel by 
Tatort: Tote brauchen keine Wohnung (1973, TV series episode)
Ein fröhliches Dasein (1974, TV film) — screenplay by Robert Wolfgang Schnell
Lehmanns Erzählungen (1975, TV film) — based on a story by Siegfried Lenz
Schließfach 763 (1975, TV film) — screenplay by 
 (1975, TV series, 13 episodes)
 (1975, TV miniseries) — based on Burning Daylight by Jack London
Tatort:  (1976, TV series episode)
Um zwei Erfahrungen reicher (1976, TV film) — screenplay by Robert Wolfgang Schnell
Prozeß Medusa (1976, TV film) — based on a novel by 
Tatort: Spätlese (1977, TV series episode)
MS Franziska (1978, TV miniseries)
Das verschollene Inka-Gold (1978, TV film) — based on a story by Jack London
Feuerwasser (1978, TV film) — based on a play by Ulrich Becher
Tatort:  (1979, TV series episode)
Iron Gustav (1979, TV miniseries) — based on the novel Iron Gustav by Hans Fallada
Tatort: Schussfahrt (1980, TV series episode)
Tatort:  (1980, TV series episode)
Die Pawlaks (1982, TV miniseries)
 (1983, TV series, 4 episodes)
Satan ist auf Gottes Seite (1983, TV film) — based on a novel by Hans Herlin
Tatort:  (1984, TV series episode)
Der Snob (1984, TV film) — based on a play by Carl Sternheim
So ein Theater (1984, TV film)
 (1985, TV miniseries)

As screenwriter
The Axe of Wandsbek (dir. Falk Harnack, 1951) — based on a novel by Arnold Zweig

As actor
 The Street Song (1931)
 Secret of the Blue Room (1932)
 Tannenberg (1932)
 Homecoming to Happiness (1933)
 Grand Duchess Alexandra (1933)
 The Hymn of Leuthen (1933)
 Stronger Than Regulations (1936)
 Susanne in the Bath (1936)
 Togger (1937)
 All Lies (1938)
 By a Silken Thread (1938)
 D III 88 (1939)
 Shoulder Arms (1939)
 Legion Condor (1939)
 Jud Süß (1940)
 Friedemann Bach (1941)
 Riding for Germany (1941)
 The Big Game (1942)

External links

 Literature on Wolfgang Staudte

1906 births
1984 deaths
Mass media people from Saarland
German male film actors
People from Saarbrücken
People from the Rhine Province
Commanders Crosses of the Order of Merit of the Federal Republic of Germany
20th-century German male actors